Everson may refer to:

People with the surname
 Ben Everson (born 1987), English footballer
 Bill Everson (1906–1966), Welsh international rugby union player
 Cliff Everson, a New Zealand car designer and manufacturer
 Corinna Everson (born 1958), American female bodybuilder
 Cromwell Everson (1925–1991), Afrikaans and South African composer
 Everson aircraft, pioneer New Zealand aircraft design company
 Mark Everson (born 1954), American Commissioner of Internal Revenue
 Michael Everson (born 1963), or his Unicode font Everson Mono
 William Everson (poet) (1912–1994), American poet and small press printer
 William Everson (Wisconsin politician) (1841-1928), an American politician

People with the given name
 Everson Griffen (born 1987), an American football player
 Everson Pereira da Silva (born 1975), also known as simply Everson, Brazilian footballer
 Éverson Felipe Marques Pires (born 1990), Brazilian footballer
 Everson (footballer, born 1997), Brazilian footballer full name Everson Bispo Pereira

Places
 Everson, Pennsylvania
 Everson, Washington

Other uses
 Everson aircraft and automobiles
 Everson Museum of Art in Syracuse, New York

See also
 Everson v. Board of Education